The  Little League World Series took place in South Williamsport, Pennsylvania, between August 18 and 28. Eight teams from the United States and eight from throughout the world competed in the 65th edition of this tournament. Ocean View Little League  of Huntington Beach, California, defeated Hamamatsu Minami Little League of Hamamatsu City, Japan, 2–1 in the World Championship game. Nick Pratto hit an RBI single to clinch the title for Ocean View.

Tournament changes
On June 16, 2011, Little League announced that it was modifying the double-elimination format that was first used in the previous year's tournament. The format of four pools consisting of four teams in each pool, a format that had been used since the tournament expanded to 16 teams in 2001, was eliminated. Instead, the eight teams from the United States were placed into one bracket, and the eight International teams into another bracket. The tournament remained double-elimination until the United States and International championship games, where it became single-elimination.

Little League International renewed deals with uniform suppliers Russell Athletic and New Era Caps. As part of the deal, regions had new color schemes this year.

Teams

 Due to complicated relations with the People's Republic of Korea, the Republic of Korea—commonly known as South Korea—is recognized by the name South Korea by a majority of international organizations, including Little League Baseball. For more information, see Cross-Strait relations. LLWS records and news accounts may use Republic of Korea, South Korea, or South Korea to refer to the same entity.

Of the 16 teams, 11 made their first LLWS appearance. The last LLWS to feature a team from the immediate Williamsport area was the  edition. Keystone's game on August 19 against the North Oldham Little League set an attendance record for Howard J. Lamade Stadium, at 41,848. The record stood until it was broken during the  event.

The Big Sky Little League team from Billings was the first team from Montana to win a regional and advance to the Little League World Series. They compiled a 3-1 record at the tournament before falling to the eventual tournament champions from Huntington Beach, California. Montana was scheduled to play the team from Tijuana, Mexico in the third place game but it was canceled due to the threat of Hurricane Irene in the latter stages of the tournament.

Results

United States bracket

International bracket

Crossover games
Teams that lost their first two games got to play a crossover game against a team from the other side of the bracket that also lost its first two games. These games were labeled Game A and Game B.

World Championship

The consolation game between Montana and Mexico was cancelled due to the expected arrival of Hurricane Irene.

Middle East-Africa qualification
Kampala, Uganda defeated Dhahran, Saudi Arabia in the Middle East-Africa Region Final but the Ugandan team was denied visas by the State Department. Reportedly, the visas were denied because some players provided false information, specifically related to their ages. The runner-up, Saudi Arabia, was invited to the Little League World Series in their spot.

Champions path
The Ocean View Little League won 20 games and lost 1 game to reach the Little League World Series. Overall, their record was 25–2. Their two losses came against Rancho Mission Viejo LL (from California), and Billings Big Sky LL (from Montana).

Notable players
Nick Pratto, drafted by the Kansas City Royals in the 2017 MLB Draft. (Huntington Beach, California).

Hagen Danner, drafted by the Toronto Blue Jays in the 2017 MLB Draft. (Huntington Beach, California).

Jake Fromm, Georgia Bulldogs starting Quarterback. Drafted by Buffalo Bills in the 2020 NFL Draft. (Warner Robins, Georgia).

Yonny Hernández, MLB infielder (Venezuela)

References

External links
2011 official results via Wayback Machine
2011 tournament bracket via Wayback Machine

 
Little League World Series
Little League World Series
Little League World Series